Ana María Izquierdo Huneeus (born 15 December 1960) is a Chilean actress. She appeared in more than fifty films since 1978.

Biography
Her father, Luis Izquierdo, was a doctor who was dedicated to scientific research, and her mother, Teresa Huneeus Cox, was a psychologist. She is the granddaughter of the writer Virginia Cox Balmaceda, and niece of the writer Pablo Huneeus Cox.

She studied at the La Girouette School in Las Condes and later at the Theater School of the University of Chile. She graduated in 1980 and made her professional debut the following year in the play Berlin 1930, under the direction of Eugenio Guzmán. She then participated in Alejandro Sieveking's La Remienda, and in Alicia or the Wonders She Saw in the Country, a collective creation directed by Andrés Pérez.

In 1983, she moved to the United States where she stayed until the following year working at the American Repertory Theater in Boston, and with Bread and Puppet Theater in Vermont and New York.

Selected filmography

Recognition
In 2018, she was recognized  by the Atacama Cultural Center.

References

External links 

1960 births
Living people
Chilean film actresses
Chilean women comedians